San Salvador (Spanish for "Holy Savior") is the capital of El Salvador.

San Salvador may also refer to:

Places
 Metropolitan Area of San Salvador, El Salvador
 San Salvador Department, El Salvador
 San Salvador District, Peru
 San Salvador, Entre Ríos, Argentina
 San Salvador, Hidalgo, Mexico
 San Salvador Municipality, Hidalgo, Mexico
 San Salvador, Peru
 San Salvador, Valladolid, Spain
 San Salvador Atenco, Mexico
 San Salvador de Jujuy, Argentina
 San Salvador, Paraguay
 San Salvador, a former name of Tevego, Paraguay
 San Salvador, a former name of Keelung, Taiwan, when it served as the capital of Spanish Formosa (1626–1642)
 San Salvador, a former name of Salvador, Bahia, Brazil
 San Salvador (volcano), in El Salvador
 San Salvador Island, in the Bahamas
 Isla San Salvador, a former name of Santiago Island in the Galápagos Islands
 San Salvador Island, Columbus's name for Guanahani, the first island he reached in the Americas
 A former settlement area in California consisting of La Placita, California and Agua Mansa, California
 San Salvador, Caguas, Puerto Rico, a barrio

Ships 
 San Salvador (Cabrillo's ship), Juan Rodríguez Cabrillo's flagship
 San Salvador (replica ship), a replica of Cabrillo's flagship built by the Maritime Museum of San Diego
 San Salvador, the Spanish flagship at the Battle of the Downs
 San Salvador (Guipúzcoan squadron),  a ship of the Guipúzcoa Squadron in the Spanish Armada; there was another ship of the same name in the Spanish Armada in a different squadron
 Salvador del Mundo, a 122-gun ship

Other uses
 San Salvador, Venice, a church in Venice, Italy
 San Salvador F.C., a football (soccer) club of San Salvador
 San Salvador (band), an Australian reggae rock band featuring members of Sounds Like Chicken
 San Salvador ("Holy Savior"), a title of Jesus Christ in Spanish
 San Salvador, the Spanish name of St Salvador of Horta (1520–1567), a Spanish saint
 Towers of the churches of San Salvador and Santa Cruz (Madrid)

See also 
 Sant Salvador (disambiguation)
 Salvador del Mundo (disambiguation)
 São Salvador (disambiguation), several places and a variant spelling of some of the above